Tupelo Honey Cafe is a restaurant located in downtown Asheville, North Carolina, specializing in Southern cooking.

The restaurant was established in 2000 by Sharon Schott. The current owner is Stephen Frabitore. The restaurant is a member of the Asheville Independent Restaurant Association. Including the original, there are 17 locations in ten states.

Reception

Tupelo Honey Cafe was featured on Rachael Ray's $40 a Day show on the Food Network on November 14, 2004.  Kita Vermond of The Globe and Mail, in her search for culinary treasures in North Carolina wrote of the restaurant serving traditional foods with a healthy twist, such as fried green tomatoes dished over goat-cheese grits and basil.

References

External links
Official website

Restaurants in North Carolina
Restaurants established in 2000
2000 establishments in North Carolina
Buildings and structures in Asheville, North Carolina